A fuze is a device to detonate military munitions.

Fuze may also refer to:

Fuse (disambiguation)
Fuze Beverage, a manufacturer of teas and non-carbonated fruit drinks enriched with vitamins
Fuze (band), an English pop rock band
Fuze (company), a provider of cloud-based unified communications as a service
Sansa Fuze, a digital audio player
DJ Fuze
HTC Touch Pro or AT&T Fuze, a smartphone
Nickname of David Fiuczynski

See also
Fuzes (disambiguation)